Denniston Oliver "D. J." Moore Jr.  (born April 14, 1997) is an American football wide receiver for the Chicago Bears of the National Football League (NFL). He previously played college football at Maryland. He was drafted by the Carolina Panthers in the first round of the 2018 NFL Draft, and was traded to the Bears in March 2023.

Early years
Moore attended Imhotep Institute Charter High School in Philadelphia, Pennsylvania, where he played high school football for Imhotep Charter. He committed to the University of Maryland, College Park to play college football.

College career

Moore played college football for the Maryland Terrapins from 2015 to 2017 under head coaches Randy Edsall, Mike Locksley, and D. J. Durkin. 

As a freshman, Moore started 10 of Maryland's 12 games, recording 25 receptions for 357 yards and three touchdowns. As a sophomore, he started all 13 games and had 41 receptions for 637 yards and six touchdowns. As a junior, he started all 12 games and set a school record with 80 receptions for 1,033 yards and eight touchdowns. After his junior season, Moore was named to the First-team All-Big Ten Conference, and was the Big Ten Receiver of the Year. 

Following his junior season, Moore made the decision to enter the 2018 NFL Draft.

Collegiate statistics

Professional career
Moore was invited to the 2018 NFL combine, where he led receivers in the broad jump, and recorded the second best vertical jump.  He also ran a 4.42 second 40-yard dash.

Carolina Panthers 
Moore was drafted by the Carolina Panthers in the first round with the 24th overall pick in the 2018 NFL Draft. Moore was the first wide receiver drafted. On June 18, 2018, he signed a four-year deal worth $11.2 million featuring a $6.2 million signing bonus.

2018

Moore made his NFL debut in the Panthers' season opener against the Dallas Cowboys. In the 16–8 victory, he had no targets but did have a three-yard rush to go along with a 15-yard punt return. In the following game, a 31–24 loss to the Atlanta Falcons, he recorded a 51-yard touchdown reception for his first professional catch. In a Week 11 loss to the Detroit Lions, Moore had a breakout game with seven receptions for 157 yards and a touchdown. Overall, he finished his rookie season with 55 receptions for 788 yards and two touchdowns. He was named to the PFWA All-Rookie Team, becoming the second Panthers receiver to claim this award, joining Rae Carruth in 1997.

2019

In Week 3 against the Arizona Cardinals, Moore caught one pass for a 52-yard touchdown in the 38–20 win.  In Week 10 against the Green Bay Packers, Moore caught nine passes for 120 yards in the 24–16 loss. During Week 12 against the New Orleans Saints, Moore finished with six catches for 126 receiving yards and two receiving touchdowns as the Panthers lost 31–34. Overall, in the 2019 season, Moore finished with 87 receptions for 1,175 receiving yards and four receiving touchdowns.

2020
In Week 2, Moore recorded eight receptions for 120 receiving yards in a 17–31 loss to the Tampa Bay Buccaneers. In Week 5 against the Atlanta Falcons, Moore recorded four catches for 93 yards, including a 57-yard touchdown reception, during the 23–16 win. In Week 7, he had four receptions for 93 receiving yards and two receiving touchdowns in the 27–24 loss to the New Orleans Saints. In Week 11 against the Detroit Lions, Moore recorded seven catches for 127 yards during the 20–0 win. He was placed on the reserve/COVID-19 list by the Panthers on December 7, 2020, and activated on December 16. In Week 15 against the Green Bay Packers, Moore recorded six catches for 131 yards during the 24–16 loss. Moore finished the 2020 season with 66 receptions for 1,193 receiving yards and four receiving touchdowns.

2021
On April 30, 2021, the Panthers exercised the fifth-year option on Moore's contract. The option guarantees a salary of $11.116 million for the 2022 season. In Week 3, against the Houston Texans, Moore recorded eight receptions for 126 yards in the 24–9 victory. In the following game against the Dallas Cowboys, he recorded eight receptions for 113 yards and two touchdowns in the 36–28 loss. Moore finished the 2021 season with 93 receptions for 1,157 receiving yards and four receiving touchdowns.

2022
On March 18, 2022, Moore signed a three-year, $61.9 million contract extension with the Panthers through the 2025 season. In Week 8, against the Atlanta Falcons, Moore had six receptions for 152 yards and a touchdown in the 37–34 overtime defeat. Moore's touchdown was a 62-yard catch that appeared to set up the Panthers to win the game with only 12 seconds remaining. However, Moore took off his helmet out of bounds and was flagged for unsportsmanlike conduct, which moved the extra point back. The kick was missed and the Falcons later won the game. Moore was off the field when he was penalized and the moment became a controversial topic on whether it should have been flagged.

Chicago Bears

2023
On March 10, 2023, the Panthers agreed to trade Moore and the ninth overall pick in the 2023 NFL Draft, as well as several other draft picks, to the Chicago Bears in exchange for the first overall pick. The trade was made official when the league calendar year began on March 15.

NFL career statistics

References

External links

Carolina Panthers bio
Maryland Terrapins bio

1997 births
Living people
Players of American football from Philadelphia
American football wide receivers
Maryland Terrapins football players
Carolina Panthers players
Chicago Bears players